Supreme Airlines was the first regional low cost COMMUTER airline of India, with bases in Jaipur and Ahmedabad. It operated 18 daily flights between 11 cities under an agreement with the State Govt of Rajasthan. Between 4th October 2016 and 7th August 2018, Supreme Airlines hauled 20,625 passengers in 4167 flights, with 2000+ tones of cargo. Supreme Airlines has sued the Ministry of Civil Aviation, D.G.C.A. and Airports Authority of India for Rs. 40+ Crores.

Destinations
Supreme Airlines was flying to the following destinations as of April 2019.

Fleet

References

Airlines established in 1993
Airlines of India
Indian companies established in 1983
1983 establishments in Rajasthan
Companies based in Rajasthan